is a high altitude marshland in the Oze National Park, Japan.

Approximately 8 km2 in size, the marshland is well known for various species of plants, including the "mizu-bashō" (White Skunk Cabbage), "Nikkōkisuge" (yellow alpine lilies, Hemerocallis dumortieri var. esculenta) and "Watasuge" (Eriophorum vaginatum). The marshland is a popular hiking destination.

See also
List of Special Places of Scenic Beauty, Special Historic Sites and Special Natural Monuments

References

External links 

 National Park(English) - Ministry of the Environment Government of Japan
 Oze Preservation Foundation (English)

Natural monuments of Japan
Ozegahara
Tourist attractions in Gunma Prefecture
Landforms of Gunma Prefecture